St Thomas' Church is in the village of Crosscrake, Cumbria, England.  It is an active Anglican parish church in the Deanery of Kendal, the Archdeaconry of Westmorland and Furness, and the Diocese of Carlisle. 

The church was built in 1874–75, and was designed by the Lancaster architects Paley and Austin. It has since been modified but retains its Gothic Revival style.

History
The Paley and Austin building replaced an earlier church of 1773, and cost about £3,000 (equivalent to £ in ). The church was supported by the Wakefield family of Sedgwick House in the parish. In 1885, composer Mary Augusta Wakefield and her sister Agnes organized a music festival to raise money for St. Thomas'. The festival continues today as Mary Wakefield Westmorland Festival (but no longer supports St. Thomas').

The internal furnishings are also by Paley and Austin. The church was provided with an organ by Wilkinson of Kendal which was rebuilt in the 1980s by the East Anglian firm Holmes & Swift. The stained glass in the east window dates from about 1890, and is by Clayton and Bell.

Modifications
Because of structural failure, the tower was reduced in 1944, and then removed completely in 1963.  A shallow transept was made to disguise this, and a spirelet was added.

Administration
Its benefice was united with that of St Patrick, Preston Patrick, although the latter parish is now served by the Kirkby Lonsdale team ministry, whereas Crosscrake is in a group of parishes in the Kendal area (the Helm group).

See also

List of ecclesiastical works by Paley and Austin

References

Church of England church buildings in Cumbria
Diocese of Carlisle
Gothic Revival church buildings in England
Gothic Revival architecture in Cumbria
Paley and Austin buildings
Thomas